Ivo Grbić may refer to:

Ivo Grbić (artist) (1931–2020), Croatian artist
Ivo Grbić (footballer) (born 1996), Croatian footballer